Noctepuna is a genus of air-breathing land snails, terrestrial pulmonate gastropod mollusks in the family Camaenidae.

Species
Species within the genus Noctepuna include:
 Noctepuna muensis (Hedley, 1912)
 Noctepuna cerea (Hedley, 1894)
 Noctepuna mayana (Hedley, 1899)

References

External links 
 

Camaenidae
Taxonomy articles created by Polbot